Federico de Beni (born 23 January 1973, in Verona) is a retired road bicycle racer from Italy, who was a professional rider from 1996 to 1998.

Teams
1996: Brescialat (Italy)
1997: Brescialat-Oyster (Italy)
1998: Riso Scotti-MG Maglificio (Italy)

References
 

1973 births
Living people
Italian male cyclists
Sportspeople from Verona
Cyclists from the Province of Verona